El fantasma de la casa roja is a 1956 Mexican comic horror film directed by Miguel M. Delgado and starring Alma Rosa Aguirre, Raúl Martínez, and Antonio Espino.

Cast 
 Alma Rosa Aguirre - Mercedes Benz de Carrera
 Raúl Martínez - Raul Velasco
 Antonio Espino - Diogenes Holmes 
 Jorge Reyes - Modesto Silvestre 
 Guillermina Téllez Girón - Evangelina Buenrostro
 Víctor Alcocer - Licensiado
 Enriqueta Reza - Diana Alegre, ama de llaves 
 Armando Arriola - Dr. Hipocrates Piedra
 Conchita Gentil Arcos - Romula Feucha
 Manuel Dondé - Pedro Satan, administrador

References

External links
 

Mexican comedy horror films
1956 films
1950s Spanish-language films
1956 horror films
Films directed by Miguel M. Delgado
1950s comedy horror films
1956 comedy films
1950s Mexican films
Mexican black-and-white films